A Dharma talk (Sanskrit) or Dhamma talk (Pali) or Dharma sermon (Japanese: ,) is a public discourse on Buddhism by a Buddhist teacher.

In Theravāda Buddhism, the study of Buddhist texts and listening to Dhamma talks by monks or teachers are common and important practices.

In some Zen traditions a Dharma talk may be referred to as a teisho. However, according to Taizan Maezumi and Bernard Glassman, a teisho is "a formal commentary by a Zen master on a koan or Zen text. In its strictest sense, teisho is non-dualistic and is thus distinguished from a Dharma talk, which is a lecture on a Buddhist topic." In this sense, a teisho is thus a formal Dharma talk. Vietnamese master Thích Nhất Hạnh says the following about Dharma talks:

References

External links
Examples of recorded dharma talks in English at audiodharma.org
Examples of recorded dharma talks in English at dharmaseed.org
Tricycle: The Buddhist Review's online video dharma talks
Dharma Talk Free Distribution Magazine (Indonesia Language)
Buddhanet dharma talks
Thich Nhat Hanh dharma talks
Dhamma talks in multiple languages

Zen
Buddhist sermons